The George A. Bartlett House, also known as the Old Knights of Columbus Hall, is a Shingle style house in Tonopah, Nevada, United States. The Shingle style is more commonly found in the northeastern United States, and is almost unknown in Nevada. The house stands on a height on Mount Brougher overlooking the town. The house was built by George A. Bartlett, later a U.S. Congressman, who lost the house in the Panic of 1907. The shingled house is set on a rubblestone foundation and features an asymmetrical plan, typical of the style. The house was used as a Knights of Columbus Hall, then abandoned. Renovation began in 2008 to restore the house for use as a bed and breakfast.

The house was listed on the National Register of Historic Places in 1982.

See also
 List of Knights of Columbus buildings
 National Register of Historic Places listings in Nevada

References

External links

 George A. Bartlett House

Houses in Nye County, Nevada
Tonopah, Nevada
Bed and breakfasts in Nevada
Clubhouses on the National Register of Historic Places in Nevada
Houses completed in 1907
Houses on the National Register of Historic Places in Nevada
Knights of Columbus buildings in the United States
National Register of Historic Places in Tonopah, Nevada
Queen Anne architecture in Nevada
Shingle Style architecture in Nevada
Shingle Style houses
Victorian architecture in Nevada